John W. Gaddis (December 2, 1858 - September 5, 1931) was a noted architect of Vincennes, Indiana.  He designed numerous buildings that are preserved and listed on the National Register of Historic Places.

His works include:
Natchez Institute, Natchez, Mississippi, 1901
Perry County Courthouse, Perryville, Missouri, 1906
Saline County Courthouse (demolished), Harrisburg, Illinois, 1906 
Dr. Nelson Wilson House, 103 E National Highway, Washington, IN (Gaddis, John W.) NRHP-listed
Case Library, Baker University, Eighth and Grove, Baldwin City, KS (Gaddis, J.W.) NRHP-listed
Clarksville High School, Greenwood Ave., Clarksville, TN (Gaddis, John W.) NRHP-listed
Clay County Courthouse, Bounded by US 40, Harrison, Jackson, and Alabama Sts., Brazil, IN (Gaddis, John W.)
Olney Carnegie Library, 401 E. Main St. 	Olney 	IL (Gaddis) NRHP-listed
Pineville Courthouse Square Historic District, Along Kentucky, Pine, Virginia, and Walnut Sts., Pineville, KY (Gaddis, John W.) NRHP-listed
Shadowwood, 6451 E. Wheatland Rd., Vincennes, IN (Gaddis, J.W.) NRHP-listed
Shriver House, 117 E. 3rd. St., Flora, IL (Gaddis, J. W.) NRHP-listed
Vermillion County Jail and Sheriff's Residence, 220 E. Market St., Newport, Indiana NRHP-listed
Vincennes Masonic Temple, 501 Broadway St., Vincennes, IN (Gaddis, J.W.)
Carnegie Library (demolished), Columbus, IN
Carnegie Library (demolished), Flora, IL

He died in 1931.

References

External links
photos of Clay County Courthouse

19th-century American architects
1858 births
1931 deaths
People from Vincennes, Indiana
20th-century American architects